The Convention for the Protection of Individuals with Regard to Automatic Processing of Personal Data is a 1981 Council of Europe treaty that protects the right to privacy of individuals, taking account of the increasing flow across frontiers of personal data undergoing automatic processing.

All members of the Council of Europe have ratified the treaty. Being non–Council of Europe states, Argentina, Cabo Verde, Mauritius, Mexico, Morocco, Senegal, Tunisia, and Uruguay have acceded to the treaty.

Since 1985, this data protection convention has been updated, and a new instrument on artificial intelligence has been added. The Council of Europe approved a proposed modernization of the agreement in 2018. The modernization included an obligation to report when data breaches occur, additional accountability for data storers, and new rights for the algorithmic decision making.

See also 
 General Data Protection Regulation
 Directive 95/46/EC on the protection of personal data
 Data privacy
 Data Privacy Day
 Information privacy
 List of Council of Europe treaties

References

External links 
 Convention for the Protection of Individuals with regard to Automatic Processing of Personal Data (Council of Europe)
 Ratifications

Information privacy
Privacy legislation
Treaties entered into force in 1985
Treaties concluded in 1981
Council of Europe treaties
Treaties of Albania
Treaties of Andorra
Treaties of Armenia
Treaties of Austria
Treaties of Azerbaijan
Treaties of Argentina
Treaties of Belgium
Treaties of Bosnia and Herzegovina
Treaties of Bulgaria
Treaties of Croatia
Treaties of Cyprus
Treaties of the Czech Republic
Treaties of Denmark
Treaties of Estonia
Treaties of Finland
Treaties of France
Treaties of Georgia (country)
Treaties of West Germany
Treaties of Greece
Treaties of Hungary
Treaties of Iceland
Treaties of Ireland
Treaties of Italy
Treaties of Latvia
Treaties of Liechtenstein
Treaties of Lithuania
Treaties of Luxembourg
Treaties of Malta
Treaties of Mauritius
Treaties of Moldova
Treaties of Monaco
Treaties of Montenegro
Treaties of Morocco
Treaties of the Netherlands
Treaties of Norway
Treaties of Poland
Treaties of Portugal
Treaties of Romania
Treaties of Russia
Treaties of San Marino
Treaties of Serbia and Montenegro
Treaties of Slovakia
Treaties of Slovenia
Treaties of Spain
Treaties of Sweden
Treaties of Switzerland
Treaties of North Macedonia
Treaties of Tunisia
Treaties of Turkey
Treaties of Ukraine
Treaties of Uruguay
Treaties of the United Kingdom
1981 in France
Treaties extended to Jersey
Treaties extended to Guernsey
Treaties extended to the Isle of Man